Harold William Hassall (4 March 1929 –  30 January 2015) was a professional footballer, who played as a forward for Huddersfield Town and Bolton Wanderers in the 1940s and 1950s.

Harold was one of four Hassall brothers. He lived relatively near to where he was born. He also played 5 matches for England, in which he scored 4 goals.

He coached Malaysia national football team from 1969 to 1970.

Harold's career was ended earlier than expected due to a serious knee injury picked up during his Bolton days on New Year's Day 1955.

He died in Bolton on 30 January 2015.

References

1929 births
2015 deaths
Footballers from Bolton
English footballers
England international footballers
Huddersfield Town A.F.C. players
Bolton Wanderers F.C. players
Association football forwards
English Football League players
English Football League representative players
Malaysia national football team managers
English football managers
FA Cup Final players